Ertman is a surname. Notable people with the surname include:

Jennifer Ertman (died 1993), American murder victim
Martha Ertman (born  1964), American law professor

See also
Erman